Grand, (Grand/State in station announcements) is an "L" station on the CTA's Red Line. It serves Navy Pier, which is accessible via bus on Illinois Street one block south.

Location
The first stop north of the Chicago River on the Red Line, Grand station is located in the River North neighborhood of the city. More specifically, it lies underneath North State Street at its intersection with Grand Avenue. Due to its central location, it is close to a number of landmarks in Chicago, with Navy Pier to the east and the Merchandise Mart (which has its own station on the Brown and Purple Lines).

History

During the 1950s, the CTA implemented skip-stop service throughout the "L" system. As a result, all trains stopped at these stations. The skip-stop service was discontinued due to budget cuts in the 1990s.

Renovation
In line with other downtown stations, Grand station underwent renovation from 2007 until 2012. The project doubled the station's capacity through a  mezzanine expansion as well as widening stairways and adding elevators.  The final cost for the renovation was $73.6 million.

Unlike most State Street subway stations, Grand uses a side platform configuration with two tracks. This setup does exist, however, at Chicago/State and  stations. There are entrances from street level at all corners of the intersection of North State Street and Grand Avenue. One level below street level lies a mezzanine containing fare control, while the platforms are located beneath the mezzanine.

Operations and connections
In the era immediately before the State Street subway opened, Grand Avenue had a streetcar service from either Harlem Avenue or Western Avenue (cars alternated between them) in the west to Navy Pier in the east. However, service was cut back from Navy Pier on September 28, 1941, and the tracks were removed on August 14, 1943. Buses began supplementing streetcar service to serve the Grand stations on the North Side Main Line and the State Street subway and relieve streetcar congestion, the service was extended to the entirety of the route on December 4, 1949; buses would replace streetcars altogether on April 1, 1951. 

CTA
 29 State
 36 Broadway
 65 Grand

Other
 Navy Pier Trolley (May–September Only)

Notes and references

Notes

References

Works cited

External links

 Grand/State Station Page on the CTA official site
 Grand/State Station Page at Chicago-L.org
 Grand Avenue entrance from Google Maps Street View

CTA Red Line stations
Railway stations in the United States opened in 1943